The Glebe-Burwood Wolves are a rugby league club based in Concord, New South Wales. They compete in the Ron Massey Cup and also field junior sides from Under 6 to Under 17 age groups in the Balmain District Junior Rugby League. In the Ron Massey Cup, they were initially known as the Concord-Burwood-Glebe Wolves, following a merger with foundation club Glebe. Their colours are charcoal and pink and since the incorporation of foundation club Glebe into the merger in 2017, the club occasionally wears the famous dirty red and white jersey worn by Glebe from 1908 to 1929. This is the first time in 87 years that the Glebe colours have been worn in a NSWRL competition.

History

The club was originally founded in 2001 after a merger between Concord Rugby League club and Burwood Rugby League club. The club played under the name of Concord-Burwood United Wolves in all grades until the 2011 season. In 2011, the A-Grade side merged with the North-Ryde Hawks to form Burwood North Ryde United for the purpose of having a more competitive team. After a successful year in A-Grade, winning both the premiership and minor premiership, the merged club entered a team into the Bundaberg Red Cup for the 2012 season. They competed as Burwood North Ryde United in this competition from 2012 to 2014. In 2015, the merger disbanded and the club played in the Ron Massey Cup as a standalone club, the Concord-Burwood Wolves, for two seasons. In 2017, the Glebe rugby league side, after being absent from any competition since 1929, was merged into the club with the plans of fielding their own separate side for 2018. In 2017, the club was also announced to be in a partnership with Intrust Super Premiership NSW side North Sydney Bears as one of their pathway clubs. In the 2017 Ron Massey Cup season, Concord-Burwood-Glebe finished 7th on the table and qualified for the finals. On 3 September 2017, they played against The Auburn Warriors but were defeated 29-20 thus being eliminated from the competition.  For The 2018 Ron Massey Cup season it was announced that the club had changed its name to The Glebe-Burwood Wolves 

Glebe-Burwood enjoyed a good 2018 season with the club qualifying for the finals and advancing all the way to the preliminary final before being defeated 24-22 by defending premiers the Wentworthville Magpies.
At the end of the 2019 Ron Massey Cup season, Glebe-Burwood finished in second last position on the table only 2 points above last placed Brothers Penrith.

Due to the Covid-19 pandemic.  The Ron Massey Cup and Sydney Shield competitions were cancelled along with the Canterbury Cup NSW.  As a result, Glebe entered into the temporary Presidents Cup competition.  Glebe would go on to reach the grand final against the Maitland Pickers but were defeated 17-16 at Bankwest Stadium.

Notable players 
Mosese Pangai (2012 North Queensland Cowboys)
Junior Roqica (2014 Cronulla-Sutherland Sharks)
Kyle Lovett (2015-2018) Wests Tigers, Leigh Centurions, Workington Town)

Playing Record in NSWRL Competitions
Under different incarnations the club has entered teams in lower tier competitions run by the New South Wales Rugby League.

See also

List of rugby league clubs in Australia
Rugby league in New South Wales

Sources

References

External links

Rugby league teams in Sydney
Ron Massey Cup
Rugby clubs established in 2001
Sports clubs disestablished in 2001
2001 establishments in Australia